José Louis and the Paradox of Love is the third studio album by Canadian singer-songwriter Pierre Kwenders, released April 29, 2022 on Arts & Crafts Productions. The album features lyrics in French, English, Lingala, Kikongo and Tshiluba.

The album was the winner of the 2022 Polaris Music Prize, and was a shortlisted Juno Award nominee for Global Music Album of the Year at the Juno Awards of 2023.

Track listing

References

2022 albums
Arts & Crafts Productions albums
Polaris Music Prize-winning albums
Pierre Kwenders albums